Troy Marc Williams (born September 11, 1994) is an American professional gridiron football quarterback for the Pittsburgh Maulers of the United States Football League (USFL). He played college football at Washington and Utah.

College career
Williams began his collegiate career at Washington and redshirted his true freshman season. He played in four games with one start as a redshirt freshman in 2014, completing 23 of 36 passes for 176 yards with two interceptions and rushing for 25 yards and one touchdown on 16 carries. After the season Williams announced he would be leaving the program.

He ultimately enrolled at Santa Monica College. In his lone season at Santa Monica he led the Corsairs to an 11–0 record while throwing for 2,750 yards with 31 touchdowns and four interceptions and rushing for seven touchdowns. During the football season Williams committed to transfer to Utah at the end of his fall semester.

Williams was named the Utes starting quarterback going into his first season with the team. He passed for 2,757 yards with 15 touchdowns and eight interceptions while also rushing for 235 yards and five touchdowns as the Utes went 9–4. Going into his redshirt senior year Williams lost his starting quarterback job to Tyler Huntley in training camp. He played in eight games and started three games when Huntley was unavailable due to injury in his final collegiate season, passing for 812 yards with four touchdowns and two interceptions and also rushing for four touchdowns.

Professional career
After going unselected in the 2018 NFL Draft, Williams participated in rookie minicamps Seattle Seahawks and the Los Angeles Chargers on a tryout basis was not signed by either team. He was invited to another tryout by the Seahawks in 2019 but was not signed.

Edmonton Eskimos
Williams was signed by the Edmonton Eskimos of the Canadian Football League on June 2, 2019. He spent most of the season on the Eskimos' practice roster but was elevated to the active roster prior to week 18. Williams played in two games during the 2019 season, completing one of three passes for 15 yards with an interception and rushing for 26 yards.

After the CFL canceled the 2020 season due to the COVID-19 pandemic, Williams chose to opt-out of his contract with the Eskimos on August 31, 2020. He signed a contract extension through the 2022 season on January 15, 2021.

Saskatchewan Roughriders
Williams was signed by the Saskatchewan Roughriders on May 10, 2022. Williams was released by the Roughriders on June 3, 2022.

Pittsburgh Maulers
Williams signed with the Pittsburgh Maulers of the United States Football League on September 26, 2022.

References

External links
Utah Utes bio

1994 births
Living people
Canadian football quarterbacks
American players of Canadian football
American football quarterbacks
Utah Utes football players
Players of American football from Los Angeles
Edmonton Elks players
Washington Huskies football players
Santa Monica Corsairs football players
People from Harbor City, Los Angeles
Pittsburgh Maulers (2022) players
Players of Canadian football from Los Angeles